Erwin Schädler (8 April 1917 – 1991) was a German international footballer.

References

1917 births
1991 deaths
Association football midfielders
German footballers
SSV Ulm 1846 players
Eintracht Frankfurt players
Germany international footballers